Manuel Landeta (born José Manuel Goenaga Jassan on October 5, 1958) is a Mexican singer and actor of telenovelas. His two sons Imanol and Jordi Landeta are also actors and singers.

Career 
Manuel Landeta started his acting career at the age of 26 in the telenovela La pasión de Isabela ("Isabela's passion"). The following year he was part of the cast in Juana Iris another telenovela on Televisa. In 1986 he obtained his first starring role in Martín Garatuza, as the character of the same name in a story that takes place in Colonial Mexico. He also participated in the plays José el soñador (1998) and Loco por tí (2000). In 2001 he recorded an album titled Mírame and in 2004 he made his first two films.

, he participated in Bailando por México (the Mexican version of Dancing with the Stars).  He is part of the cast of the erotic show Sólo para mujeres and of the play Anita la huerfanita (the Mexican version of Annie) with Ana Layevska. He also dances and takes off his clothes on the erotic show called Solo Para Mujeres. He is a Mexican sex symbol.

Filmography

Awards and nominations

References

External links
 

1958 births
Living people
Mexican male film actors
Mexican male stage actors
Mexican male telenovela actors
Mexican people of Basque descent
Mexican people of Lebanese descent